The String Quartet, Op. 3, by Alban Berg was composed in 1910. It was not published until 1920.

The two-movement string quartet is among Berg's most original compositions. Reminiscent of Schoenberg's F minor quartet, the sound owes more to Romanticism than to contemporary composers like Webern. It was probably the first extended composition consistently based on symmetrical pitch relations.

Along with the composer's Piano Sonata, it received its premiere on 24 April 1911 at the Vienna Musikverein.

References

External links

String quartet Op. 3, Answers.com. Accessed 27 May 2006.
, New Zealand String Quartet, 2004

Compositions by Alban Berg
Berg
1910 compositions